Goss is a village in Monroe County, Missouri, United States; it was once incorporated as a town, but reclassified as a village in 2010. The village has no permanent residents, and it is the least populous town in the United States.

History
A post office called Goss was established in 1885, and remained in operation until 1954. The community has the name of James Goss, an early settler.

Demographics

As of the 2020 census, Goss has a population of 0. The village is served by U.S. Route 24.

References

Villages in Monroe County, Missouri
Villages in Missouri
1885 establishments in Missouri
Populated places established in 1885